Monterey National Forest was established as the Monterey Forest Reserve by the U.S. Forest Service in California on June 25, 1906 with . It became a National Forest on March 4, 1907. On July 1, 1908 Pinnacles National Forest and San Benito National Forest were added. On August 8, 1919 the entire forest was transferred to Santa Barbara National Forest and the name was discontinued. The lands presently exist in Los Padres National Forest.

References

External links
Forest History Society
Forest History Society:Listing of the National Forests of the United States Text from Davis, Richard C., ed. Encyclopedia of American Forest and Conservation History. New York: Macmillan Publishing Company for the Forest History Society, 1983. Vol. II, pp. 743-788.

Los Padres National Forest
Former National Forests of California
1906 establishments in California
Protected areas established in 1906
1919 disestablishments in California
Protected areas disestablished in the 1910s